Piotr Koman (born June 25, 1985 in Wadowice) is a Polish footballer who plays for Okocimski KS Brzesko.

Career

Club
In February 2009, he was loaned to Pogoń Szczecin where he spent one and half year. He returned to Podbeskidzie in June 2010.

References

External links
 

Polish footballers
Pogoń Szczecin players
Podbeskidzie Bielsko-Biała players
1985 births
Living people
People from Wadowice County
Sportspeople from Lesser Poland Voivodeship
Association football midfielders